A fritillary is a bulbous plant of the genus Fritillaria, with bell-shaped flowers, native to the Northern Hemisphere.

The name fritillary is also given to several different genera of nymphalid butterflies:

 Argynnis
 Boloria
 Speyeria, the greater fritillaries, now a subgenus of Argynnis
 Euphydryas
 Melitaea
Agraulis

See also

List of fritillaries (butterflies)

Animal common name disambiguation pages